Geoffrey Douglas Madge (born 3 October 1941) is an Australian classical pianist and composer.

Biography 
Madge was born in Adelaide and took his first piano lessons at the age of eight. He later won the 1963 ABC Concerto and Vocal Competition. After winning this competition he left for Europe in 1963 and settled in the Netherlands. He was appointed professor of piano at the Royal Conservatory in The Hague.

Madge is known for performing long and arduous works. He was the first to record Leopold Godowsky's Studies on Chopin's Études, once described as "the most impossibly difficult things ever written for the piano". He has given six complete performances of Sorabji's Opus clavicembalisticum, one of the longest and most difficult works ever written for the piano. In 1982, 52 years after Sorabji premiered the work, Madge gave the work its second public performance. Two of Madge's performances of the work have been released commercially.

In 1979, he gave the first complete performance of Nikos Skalkottas's 32 Piano Pieces.

References

External links
 Geoffrey Madge biography

Australian classical pianists
Male classical pianists
Australian composers
1941 births
Living people
Australian expatriates in the Netherlands
Academic staff of the Royal Conservatory of The Hague
21st-century classical pianists
21st-century Australian male musicians
21st-century Australian musicians
20th-century classical pianists
20th-century Australian male musicians
20th-century Australian musicians
Male composers
21st-century composers
20th-century composers